Stellingwerf is a Dutch surname. Notable people with the surname include:

Auke Stellingwerf (1635–1665), Dutch admiral
Dick Stellingwerf (born 1953), Dutch politician

See also
Stellingwarfs dialect
Stellingwerff

Dutch-language surnames